The 1981 United Bank Classic, also known as the Denver WCT, was a men's tennis tournament played on indoor carpet courts in Denver, Colorado in the United States that was part of the 1981 Grand Prix circuit. It was the tenth edition of the tournament and took place from March 2 through March 8, 1981. First-seeded Gene Mayer won his second consecutive singles title at the event.

Finals

Singles
 Gene Mayer defeated  John Sadri 6–4, 6–4
 It was Mayer's 2nd singles title of the year and the 9th of his career.

Doubles
 Butch Walts /  Andrew Pattison defeated  Mel Purcell /  Dick Stockton 6–3, 6–4

References

External links
 ITF tournament edition details

United Bank Classic
Indoor tennis tournaments
United Bank Classic
United Bank Classic
United Bank Classic